Hassiacosuchus is an extinct genus of small alligatorid from the early Eocene of Germany, found at the Messel pit.  It was named in 1935 by K. Weitzel, and the type species is H. haupti. A second species, H. kayi, was named in 1941 by C.C. Mook for material from the Bridgerian (early Eocene) of Wyoming, but was reassigned to Procaimanoidea in 1967 by Wassersug and Hecht. Hassiacosuchus may be the same as Allognathosuchus; Christopher Brochu has recommended continuing to use Hassiacosuchus.

The cladogram below from the 2020 Cossette & Brochu study shows the placement of Hassiacosuchus within Alligatoridae:

References

External links
Hassiacosuchus in the Paleobiology Database

Alligatoridae
Eocene crocodylomorphs
Eocene reptiles of Europe
Prehistoric pseudosuchian genera
Fossil taxa described in 1935